Sarcas Circa 2020 is a 2021 Indian Malayalam film directed and co-written by Vinu Kolichal after his directorial debut Bilathikuzhal. Produced by Joseph Abraham and Raveendran Chettathode under the banner of kad cafe. The film features Jijo K Mathew, Abhija Sivakala, Firos Khan in lead roles. The film is predominantly set in Kasaragod. The film was released on 1 April 2021.

Cast

Music
The music is composed by Seljuk Rustum and lyrics are written by Hareesh Pallaram and Siva Odayamchal.

References

External links 

2021 films
2020s Malayalam-language films